Love Always, Carolyn is a 2011 English-language Swedish documentary film written and directed by Malin Korkeasalo and Maria Ramström.  The film is about Carolyn Cassady's recollection of life with husband Neal Cassady and Jack Kerouac, and her concern that the truth about these men is being lost in their mythos.  It features interviews with Carolyn Cassady and her children as well as archive footage. The film premiered at the 2011 Tribeca Film Festival.

References

External links

2011 films
2011 documentary films
Documentary films about women writers
Jack Kerouac
Swedish documentary films
2010s Swedish films